Zebedee E. Cliff  (September 23, 1864 – June 13, 1934) was an American architect, builder and politician who served in the Massachusetts House of Representatives  and as the sixteenth Mayor of Somerville, Massachusetts.

Early life
Cliff was born in Fredericton, New Brunswick on September 23, 1864.

Trivia
The four masted schooner Zebedee E. Cliff was named for Cliff.

Cliff's home in Somerville, built circa 1900, was listed on the United States National Register of Historic Places in 1989.

Notes

1864 births
Politicians from Fredericton
Massachusetts city council members
Republican Party members of the Massachusetts House of Representatives
Mayors of Somerville, Massachusetts
1934 deaths
Canadian emigrants to the United States